Horenka is a village in Bucha Raion (district) in Kyiv Oblast of Ukraine, on the NW border of the city of Kyiv. It belongs to Hostomel settlement hromada, one of the hromadas of Ukraine. 

Until 18 July 2020, Horenka was located in Kyiv-Sviatoshyn Raion. The raion was abolished that day as part of the administrative reform of Ukraine, which reduced the number of raions of Kyiv Oblast to seven. The area of Kyiv-Sviatoshyn Raion was split between Bucha, Fastiv, and Obukhiv Raions, with Horenka being transferred to Bucha Raion.

On March 14, 2022, during the Russian invasion of Ukraine, journalists Pierre Zakrzewski and Oleksandra Kuvshinova, respectively a camera operator for and contractor with Fox News, were fatally wounded in the village. Their colleague Benjamin Hall was seriously injured.

References

Villages in Bucha Raion